Banyaran-e Mirza Hoseyn (also Romanized as Bānyārān-e Mīrzā Ḩoseyn) is a village in Qalkhani Rural District, Gahvareh District, Dalahu County, Kermanshah Province, Iran. At the 2006 census, its population was 56, in 15 families.

References 

Populated places in Dalahu County